is a Japanese cyclist. He competed in four events at the 1952 Summer Olympics.

References

External links
 

1929 births
Possibly living people
Japanese male cyclists
Olympic cyclists of Japan
Cyclists at the 1952 Summer Olympics